Mohammad Taqi Danesh Pajouh or Mohammad Taghi Daneshpajouh (born 1911 in Amol and died 1996) was a writer, musician, translator, orientalist and Iranian scholar, a member of the Academy of Persian Language and Literature, professor at the University of Tehran and the father codicology of Iran.

He entered the Faculty of Law at Tehran University and took his bachelor's degree in 1941. He served for decades as deputy librarian at Tehran of Political Science before joining the Department of History of the Faculty of Theology at that school. In addition to editing and publishing the works of others, he authored a number of articles of his own.

He also traveled to obtain bibliographic and manuscript information and to order it from the University of Tehran to Baghdad, Najaf, Karbala and Kazemin in Iraq, Medina and Mecca in Saudi Arabia, Moscow, Leningrad in Russia, Tbilisi, Dushanbe, Tashkent, Bukhara, Samarkand, and Baku in Central Asia, Paris, Munich, Leiden, Utrecht, and Istanbul in Europe and continued to travel to Cambridge, Boston, Princeton, Ann Arbor, Michigan, Chicago and New York in the United States.
Danesh Pajouh became an honorary member of French-Asian Association and Institut Français de Recherche en Iran, for has been honored for its extensive knowledge of Persian texts and for its philosophy, logic, literature, theology, librarianship, and cataloging of oriental manuscripts. He was a professor at the Faculty of Theology at the University of Tehran. Danesh Pajouh together with Iraj Afshar, Manouchehr Sotoudeh, Mostafa Mogharebi and Abbas Zaryab Khoei, founded Farhang Iran Zamin Magazine.

See also 
 Dastur al-Muluk

References

External links 
 Iraj Afshar biography - danesh pajoh 
 M. T. Danesh Pajouh (mt.daneshpajouh.free.fr) 
 Biography, at aftabir.com 
 Professor Mohammad Taqi Danesh Pajouh, bibliographer and lover of philosophy
 Mohammad Taghi Daneshpajouh Hall / Central Library of University of Tehran

1996 deaths
1911 births
Iranian translators
People from Amol
20th-century translators
20th-century Iranian historians
Iranian librarians
20th-century Iranian musicians
Iranian male writers
Faculty of Theology and Islamic Studies of the University of Tehran alumni
Iran's Book of the Year Awards recipients
Codicologists